Aciotis is a genus of flowering plants in the family Melastomataceae. There are about 13 species distributed from Mexico to Brazil.

Species include:

 Aciotis acuminifolia (Mart. ex DC.) Triana
 Aciotis annua (Mart. ex DC.) Triana
 Aciotis aristellata Markgr.
 Aciotis asplundii Wurdack
 Aciotis circaeifolia (Bonpl.) Triana	
Aciotis ferreirana		
 Aciotis indecora (Bonpl.) Triana
 Aciotis oliveriana  Freire-Fierro
 Aciotis ornata (Miq.) Gleason	
 Aciotis paludosa (Mart. ex DC.) Triana
 Aciotis polystachya (Bonpl.) Triana	
 Aciotis purpurascens (Aubl.) Triana	
 Aciotis rubricaulis (Mart. ex DC.) Triana	
 Aciotis viscida (Benth.) Freire-Fierro	
 Aciotis wurdackiana  Freire-Fierro

References

 
Melastomataceae genera
Taxonomy articles created by Polbot